Kim Kyung-Jung (born 16 April 1991) is a South Korean association football player who currently plays for FC Anyang as a striker. He had represented the South Korea national under-20 football team and participated in the 2011 FIFA U-20 World Cup.

Career

Girondins de Bordeaux
Kim joined French Ligue 1 outfit Girondins de Bordeaux on a loan deal until the end of the 2011–12 season.

International career
Kim has participated in the 2011 U-20 World Cup. On 30 July 2011, Kim scored his first goal against Mali U-20 team in the group stage.

References

External links 
 
 
 KFA Player Profile
 

1991 births
Living people
Association football forwards
South Korean footballers
South Korean expatriate footballers
FC Girondins de Bordeaux players
Al-Rayyan SC players
Stade Malherbe Caen players
Tokushima Vortis players
Gangwon FC players
Gimcheon Sangmu FC players
Ligue 1 players
Ligue 2 players
J2 League players
K League 1 players
Expatriate footballers in Estonia
Expatriate footballers in France
South Korean expatriate sportspeople in France
Korea University alumni
Qatari Second Division players
Sportspeople from Gwangju